Dagnija Staķe (born 3 September 1951, Vietalva parish) is a Latvian politician (Latvian Farmers' Union) and the Minister of Regional Development and Local Governments of Latvia from 13 May to 3 November 2010.

References

1951 births
Living people
People from Aizkraukle Municipality
Democratic Party "Saimnieks" politicians
Latvian Farmers' Union politicians
Ministers of Welfare of Latvia
Ministers of Regional Development and Local Governments of Latvia
Deputies of the 9th Saeima
Women government ministers of Latvia
Women deputies of the Saeima
21st-century Latvian women politicians
University of Daugavpils alumni